Mehdi Haeri Yazdi (b. 1923, Qom, Sublime State of Persia – 8 July 1999, Tehran, Iran) was an Iranian philosopher and Shia Islamic cleric. He was the first son of Abdul Karim Haeri Yazdi, the founder of Qom Seminary and teacher of Ayatollah Ruhollah Khomeini, who became the leader of the Iranian Revolution and founder of the Islamic Republic of Iran.

Family
Mahdi Ha'iri yazdi was son of the late Ayatollah Ha'iri, a Shiite authority and disciple of Ayatollah Boroujerdi. He was a teacher of theology and Islamic philosophy.

Academic career
Ha'iri received his Ph.D in philosophy from University of Toronto. He taught Islamic philosophy at the University of Toronto and McGill University.

Background
Mehdi Haeri Yazdi was "one of Khomeini's prominent pupils"  but parted ways with Khomeini on several issues. He opposed Khomeini's theory of velayat-e faqih as justification for rule of the Islamic state by Islamic jurists, Khomeini's unwillingness to end the Iran–Iraq War, and believed Khomeini's fatwa against Salman Rushdie was "inconsistent with the principles of Islamic law, or Shari'a" and "against the interests of Muslim society."
Haeri-Yazdi published his objection to the velayat-e faqih in his 1994 book Hekmat va Hokumat. The book was published in London, but nevertheless has been widely distributed in Iran.

In 1992 he published The Principles of Epistemology in Islamic Philosophy : Knowledge by Presence. The book aimed to present Western scholars and philosophers a theme that he considered most important : knowledge by presence - knowledge that arises from immediate and intuitive awareness.

With his knowledge of Islamic philosophy and other Islamic fields, as well as his formal training in contemporary Western philosophical traditions, Mehdi Haeri Yazdi sought to study the core concerns of modernity and Islam. Farzin Vahdat discusses Yazdi's ideas in his book Islamic Ethos and the Specter of Modernity (2015).

Works
In Persian:
Hekmat va Hokumat (London 1994)
Kavushha-ye Aql-e Nazari
Hiram-e Hasti
Kavushha-ye Aql-e Amali
 safare Nafs( the journey of soul)
Analytical philosophy
Memoirs of Hairi-Yazdi, 2004 (Harvard Iranian Oral History) (English and Old Persian Edition)
In English:
The Principles of Epistemology in Islamic Philosophy: Knowledge by Presence. SUNY Press 1992

See also 

 List of Ayatollahs

References 

1923 births
1999 deaths
Muslim reformers
Iranian reformists
Iranian writers
Iranian ayatollahs
People from Qom